Phúc Trạch may refer to several places in Vietnam, including:

Phúc Trạch, Quảng Bình, a rural commune of Bố Trạch District.
Phúc Trạch, Hà Tĩnh, a rural commune of Hương Khê District.